Glendale is a village in the town of Burrillville, Rhode Island, United States. The United States Postal Service has assigned Glendale the ZIP Code 02826.

References 

Villages in Providence County, Rhode Island
Burrillville, Rhode Island
Providence metropolitan area
Villages in Rhode Island